La Quotidienne was a French Royalist newspaper.

History
It was set up in 1790 by M. de Coutouly. It ceased publication in the face of events in 1792, before returning to print in July 1794 under the title Le Tableau de Paris, returning to its original title in 1817.

In 1817, Joseph-François Michaud became its chief editor, holding the post until his death in 1839. 
In February 1847, it merged with La France and L'Écho français to create L'Union monarchique (renamed  L'Union in 1848). Pierre-Sébastien Laurentie took over its editorship and turned it into an Ultra-Royalist publication. In it Lamartine published his letter  Opinion du citoyen Lamartine sur le Communisme. Also, on 27 October 1873, it published the open letter to Pierre Charles Chesnelong by which the  Comte de Chambord reiterated his attachment to the royalist white flag and refused all compromise.

Contributors 
Balzac published in L'Union monarchique, from 7 April to 3 May 1847, his incompleted novel Le Député d'Arcis. He also published his second communiqué (the first she saw) to his future wife, Eveline Hańska, in La Quotidienne.
Joseph-Alphonse Esménard,
Joseph-Arthur de Gobineau, entrusted from 1840 with a chronicle of diplomatic affairs. In 1846 he published in the paper a 'roman-feuilleton', Les Aventures de Jean de La Tour-Miracle then Nicolas Belavoir,.
Charles Nodier,
Pierre-Sébastien Laurentie (1817–1830),
Jean Joseph François Poujoulat
Jean-Baptiste Honoré Raymond Capefigue (1801–1872), historian and biographer

Notes

1790 establishments in France
1847 disestablishments in France
Defunct newspapers published in France
French-language newspapers
Newspapers published in Paris
Publications established in 1790
Publications disestablished in 1847